Park Yung-hyo or Bak Young-hyo (1861 – 21 September 1939) was a Korean politician from the Joseon Dynasty, an enlightenment activist, diplomat and pro-Japanese collaborator. He was one of the organizers of the Gapsin Coup of 1884, in which progressive political elements attempted to overthrow the conservative Korean government. He become Prince Consort Geumneung through his marriage to Princess Yeonghye, King Cheoljong's daughter.

Early life and education
Park Yung-hyo was born in Suwon, south of Hanseong. He was the third son of Park Won-yang and his mother was Lady Yi of the Jeonui Yi clan. By birth, he also had a distant connection with the Royal Family: his 7-great-grandfather was Park Se-gyo (朴世橋, 박세교; 1611 – 1663), the only son of King Seonjo's 5th daughter, Princess Jeongan (정안 옹주; 1590 – 1660), and Park Mi, Prince Consort Geumyang (박미 금양위, 朴瀰 錦陽尉; 1592 – 1645).

On April 3, 1872, he was chosen to be the spouse of Princess Yeonghye (영혜옹주; 永惠翁主), the only living daughter of King Cheoljong, the 25th King of the Joseon Dynasty. However, the princess passed away merely three months after their wedding.

Together with Kim Ok-gyun, Park was a strong supporter of the Dongnipdang, or “Enlightenment Party”, which sought to reform the government, economy, and military by incorporating Western technology and methodology, so that Korea would become stable enough to withstand increasing foreign encroachment. He accompanied Kim on his visit to Tokyo, meeting with various influential Japanese politicians, including Fukuzawa Yukichi.

Career
He is credited with creating the first Korean national flag, in 1882.

Gapsin Coup
Park was one of the leaders of the 1884 Gapsin Coup that attempted to overthrow the government and institute Western-style reforms. The coup attempt lasted only three days before its suppression by Chinese troops. He was forced to flee to Japan, where he initially stayed with Fukuzawa Yukichi, before moving on to Kobe.

Subsequent career
Following the Japanese Occupation of Gyeongbokgung Palace, Park returned to Korea with some of his entourages such as Lee Kyu-wan, and Ryu Hyeok-ro. Arriving Seoul on 23 August 1894, Park requested a discursive authority to reform the country to Gojong. But because the public ideas about reforms were negative due to Gapsin Coup, Park was not able to gain great political power, rather he should flee to Incheon. Following the Japanese victory of Battle of Pyongyang, Korean public started to regard Japan as the new leading power of Asia. Finally on 9 December, Park and his entourages who just returned from Japan gained political independence. The Second Kim Hong-jip cabinet was established, and Park was appointed as Minister of Interior. Park did not enjoyed being a puppet of Japan; therefore, he started to build his own political basements by appointing Lee Kyu-wan as the commander of police and Ryu Hyeok-ro as the Director of Artillery. However, following the Gabo Reform and the assassination of Queen Min, Park fled to Japan once again, where he remained until 1907. On his return, he accepted the post of Royal Household Minister under Yi Wan-yong.

Following the Japan-Korea Treaty of 1910, in which Korea was annexed to the Empire of Japan, Park was awarded with the kazoku title of marquess (koshaku) in the Japanese peerage, and a seat in the House of Peers in the Diet of Japan. He served as Director of the Bank of Chosen in 1918, Chairman of the Korean Economic Association in 1919, first president of The Dong-a Ilbo newspaper in 1920, president of the Kyungbang Corporation, chairman of the Korea Industrialization Bank in 1921, and advisor to the Government-General of Korea’s Central Institute.

Family 
Among Park's granddaughters was Park Chan-ju (박찬주, 朴贊珠) (11 December 1914 – 13 July 1995), who was married to Yi U (이우, 李鍝) (15 August 1912 - 7 August 1945) and the mother of Yi Cheong (이청, 李淸) (born 23 April 1936).

Writings 
 Sahwa giryak (사화기략, 使和記略)

See also 
 Ye Wanyong
 Bak Jesun
 Yun Chi-ho

References

External links

 Park Young-hyo:Daum 
 Park Young-hyo:Korean historical People's Information 
 Park Young-hyo:navercast 
 Park Young-hyo:naver
 Park Young-hyo:nate

1861 births
1939 deaths
19th-century Korean people
Korean independence activists
Korean revolutionaries
People from Suwon
Korean collaborators with Imperial Japan
Kazoku
Alumni of the University of Edinburgh
Politicians of the Korean Empire
Officials of the Korean Empire
Joseon Kazoku